is one of the eleven wards in the city of Kyoto, in Kyoto Prefecture, Japan. Famous places in Fushimi include the Fushimi Inari Shrine, with thousands of torii lining the paths up and down a mountain; Fushimi Castle, originally built by Toyotomi Hideyoshi, with its rebuilt towers and gold-lined tea-room; and the Teradaya, an inn at which Sakamoto Ryōma was attacked and injured about a year before his assassination. Also of note is the Gokōgu shrine, which houses a stone used in the construction of Fushimi Castle. The water in the shrine is particularly famous and it is recorded as one of Japan's 100 best clear water spots.

Although written with different characters now, the name Fushimi (which used to be its own "town") originally comes from fusu + mizu, meaning "hidden water" or "underground water". In other words, the location was known for good spring water. The water of Fushimi has particularly soft characteristics, making it an essential component to the particular type of sake brewed in Fushimi. This also explains why the area developed as a sake-brewing center in Kyoto. Today, Fushimi is the second greatest area of Japan in terms of sake production, and is where the sake company Gekkeikan was founded.

Demographics

Economy
The following companies have their headquarters in Fushimi:
Kyocera, an electronics and ceramics manufacturer
Murata Machinery, an industrial machines manufacturer
Gekkeikan, a manufacturer of sake, plum wine, shōchū, mirin, and amazake
Kizakura, a manufacturer of sake and beer
Shoutoku, a manufacturer of sake

Education

Ryukoku University, Kyoto University of Education, and Shuchiin University are based in the area.

The ward has a North Korean school, Kyoto Korean Elementary School (京都朝鮮初級学校).,
Kyoto Tachibana High School
Kyoto Tachibana Senior High School
Kyoto Tachibana Junior High School

Sights

 Fushimi Inari Shrine – top shrine of largest shrine network in Japan
 Daigo-ji – UNESCO World Heritage site
 Gekkeikan Ōkura Memorial Hall – sake brewing museum
 Fushimi Castle-Toyotomi Hideyoshi's castle in Kyoto; also known as Momoyama Castle, one of the namesakes of the Azuchi-Momoyama Period of Japanese history
 Emperor Meiji Tomb
 Emperor Kanmu Tomb
 Kyoto Racecourse

Famous People 
 Haruki Murakami - [[Japanese people [Japanese]] [[writer, essayist, marathon runner, award-winning novelist] born Fushimi-ku, Kyoto,January 12, 1949.

 Keiyo Aomatsu - Japanese Nippon Professional Baseball player with the Chiba Lotte Marines of Japan's Pacific League
 Kumi Koda - Singer
 Hideki Okajima - Japanese professional baseball pitcher with the Fukuoka SoftBank Hawks
 Kyoto Tachibana Senior High School Marching Band
 Kyoto Tachibana Junior High School Marching Band

Transportation

Train stations
JR West
Nara Line
Kintetsu Railway
Kyoto Line
Keihan Electric Railway
Keihan Main Line
Uji Line
Kyoto City Subway
Karasuma Line
Tozai Line

Road
Meishin Expressway
Keiji Bypass
Second Keihan Highway (Daini Keihan Road)

References

External links

  

Wards of Kyoto